Malikipuram is a town of Dr. B.R. Ambedkar Konaseema district in Andhra Pradesh, India. It is located in the Amalapuram revenue division.

Malikipuram is located 30 km from the district's main city, Amalapuram, and 249 km from Visakhapatnam. Nearest Railway station  Palakollu

Tourist attractions
Antarvedi, in terms of geographical surface area, covers about 6.4 km2. The village contains the Lord Sri Lakshminarasimha Swamy temple, located opposite Vasishta Godavari. A launch pad allows visitors to land on the small island at the other side of the Godavari River - from this point, travel can then be undertaken to the convergence point of the river and the ocean.

Dindi Resort: The Godavari River island supports acres of coconut groves.

Samudra Beach Resort: Samudra Beach Resort is located in Odalarevu.

Demographics
The total population of Malikipuram is 6,286, with 3,265 males and 3,021 females living in 1,651 houses. The total area of Malikipuram is 244 hectares.

Education
Colleges near Malikipuram:
Mvn js rvr college of arts and science
Amrutha Arts & Science Degree College 
Sri Deepthi Mahila Degree College 
M. G. Jr. College, Lakkavaram 

Schools near Malikipuram:
ZP P High School, Visweswarayapuram
Z P High School, Gudimellanka
Z P High School, Gollapalem
Gowtham Model School, Malikipuram

References 

Cities and towns in Konaseema district